Christian Rosa is a Brazilian-born artist known for sparse, abstract paintings which are built up from individual shapes and marks on large raw, untreated canvases, using charcoal, oil paint, resin and pencil as well as large abstract sculptures that work like improvised automatic writing.

In January 2021 he was accused of stealing and partially forging a Raymond Pettibon painting. On October 13, 2021, Rosa was federally indicted by the FBI and Southern District of New York on multiple charges of wire fraud and identity theft related the operation of a scheme of selling forged Pettibon pantings with fake certificates of authenticity.  On the 2 December it was reported that Christian Rosa had been arrested in Portugal, and was in the process of being extradited to the United States to face charges.

Exhibitions 
Rosa first began exhibiting in Vienna in 2008. He had his first major gallery solo show at Contemporary Fine Arts in Berlin, Germany in May 2014, " Love's gonna Save the Day" during Berlin Gallery Weekend, soon followed by a major solo show at White Cube Gallery's Mason's Yard location in London. “Put Your Eye in Your Mouth” opened 20 March 2015.

In 2014/15 he exhibited frequently throughout Europe, the United States as well as South America, finishing his exhibition year with White Cube's solo show " Mais que nada" in São Paulo, Brazil.

He has participated in several international art shows, including the Venice Biennale "Momenta" in 2013, as well as the Brucennial 2012 in New York. Though he grew up in Europe, his background made him an important ambassador in a major group exhibition at Saatchi Gallery in 2014, “Pangaea: New Art from Africa and Latin America”.

2020 continued with participations at Arken Museum of Modern Art, ishøj, as well at the Pinakothek der Moderne in Munich.

Publications 
Publications of Rosa's work include: "Love's Gonna Safe The Day", published by Contemporary Fine Arts Berlin, for his solo exhibition in 2014 in Berlin, Germany. "I am in Love with the Coco", published by Kunstverein Heilbronn to accompany Rosa's solo exhibition in 2015 at the Kunstverein in Heilbronn, Germany published by Snoeck.

Projects 
Rosa is the founder and prime artist behind "Grande Vista". This project involves a unique artist in residency program in an attempt to expose emerging European as well as American artists to curators, galleries and collectors in Los Angeles.

Rosa was the executive producer for "A Wonderful Cloud", a film about exploring a former romance written and directed by Eugene Kotlyarenko. Only barely fictional (Kotlyarenko and his costar were once a couple), A Wonderful Cloud had its world premiere on 15 March at the 2015 SXSW festival.

Together with Austrian hip-hop-musician Yung Hurn he contributed the background vocals to the song "Gefühle an dich in einer Altbauwohnung, Pt.I" in 2017 as part of the "Love Hotel" album.

In 2018 Rosa teamed up with Baker Skateboards and unveiled a limited edition series of bespoke art skateboard decks featuring his ubiquitous compositions.

Personal life 
Rosa was born in Rio de Janeiro, Brazil, and was educated in Vienna, Austria, where his parents moved to when he was still young.

He studied under fellow artist Daniel Richter at the Academy of Fine Arts Vienna, the German artist who came to prominence in the 1990s when he transitioned into fine art from the world of music. Richters early paintings were abstract, characterised by intensely colourful forms that lie somewhere between graffiti and intricate ornamentation and currently creates large-scale scenes filled with figures, often inspired by reproductions from newspapers or history books.

References to music are frequent in Rosa's paintings and drawings as to Rap and Hip Hop as well as Beethoven's Symphonies at his solo show at Meyer Kainer in Vienna, Austria in 2016 .

References 

Living people
Austrian painters
Austrian male painters
Academy of Fine Arts Vienna alumni
Year of birth missing (living people)